Bristol & West (B&W) was a former mutual building society in the United Kingdom (UK), one of the first to be demutualised to become a publicly traded bank in 1997.  Bristol & West had its headquarters in Bristol, England, UK.  B&W became a division of the UK arm of the Bank of Ireland in 1997.

B&W's main activity was mortgage lending for residential and commercial customers, although in 2009, its business was transferred to Bank of Ireland and it became a shell company, and stopped accepting new customers.

The Bristol & West brand name has since been replaced by the Bank of Ireland brand.  However, Bristol & West plc shares are still being publicly traded on the London Stock Exchange (LSE) under the BWSA ticker, and globally identified under its International Securities Identification Number (ISIN) GB0000510205.

History

It offered mortgages in the Bristol and the south west of England area, and became a well known financial services institution in the region.

By 1996, Bristol & West was the ninth largest building society in the United Kingdom, at a time when the UK Government relaxed rules on funding for building societies, which led a number of building societies to demutualise and convert into banks.

In July 1997, Bristol & West demutualised, its shares began being publicly traded on the London Stock Exchange (LSE)/  It was also sold to the Bank of Ireland for £600m (€882m), becoming a UK division of the Bank of Ireland, but maintaining its operations and branch network under the existing Bristol & West brand identity.

In December 2003, the UK's Financial Services Authority (FSA) fined the Bank of Ireland owned Bristol & West subsidiary 'Chase de Vere Financial Solutions' for the "approval and issue of a misleading direct offer promotion".

In 2005, eight years after its purchase, the Bank of Ireland sold its Bristol & West plc savings and investment business to the Britannia Building Society.  The deal also included Bristol & West's 97 branches, as well as its direct savings business, for £150 million.  The sale does not include the Bristol & West brand name, as this was retained by the Bank of Ireland.  Existing Bristol & West account holders will be transferred to a Britannia branded product, and all branches will also assume the Britannia brand identity.

The Bank of Ireland continued to offer B&W mortgages to intermediaries, packagers, and direct customers; through the Bristol & West brand at its main processing centres in Bristol and Solihull; this meant the closure of a number of smaller mortgage processing centres throughout the country.  In 2007, the estimated profit from this mortgage venture was £52 million.

Following the financial crisis of 2007–08, the Bristol & West bank was suffering large losses, and as a result, the Bank of Ireland took the decision to limit mortgage lending.

On 8 January 2009, the Bank of Ireland announced to the stock market that it would close its Solihull and Reading processing centres (the Reading Centre processed Bank of Ireland mortgages only), and as of 9 January 2009, Bristol & West mortgages would cease accepting new customers.  Bank of Ireland now only offer residential mortgages in the UK through the Post Office Money brand and through their own brand in Northern Ireland.

Arms

References

External links
Bristol & West plc — official website, via Archive.org
 — Bristol & West plc live share prices at the London Stock Exchange (LSE)

Building societies of England
1850 establishments in England
2009 disestablishments in England
British companies established in 1850
British companies disestablished in 2009
Banks established in 1850
Banks disestablished in 2009
Defunct banks of the United Kingdom
Defunct companies based in Bristol
Companies listed on the London Stock Exchange